Romania participated in the Eurovision Song Contest 2006 in Athens, Greece. They selected their entry, "Tornerò" (meaning: "I Will Return"), by Romanian singer Mihai Trăistariu through the national selection competition Selecția Națională 2006 in February 2006. Controversy surrounded the event, as seventh-placed duo Indiggo accused the organising broadcaster, Romanian Television (TVR), of vote rigging. Prior to the 2006 contest, Romania had participated in the Eurovision Song Contest eight times since its first entry in 1994. Its highest placing in the contest had been third place, which the nation achieved in 2005.

Prior to Eurovision, "Tornerò" was promoted by a music video, live performances, radio submissions and fellow endeavours in several countries. Romania ultimately reached fourth place in the contest's final on 20 May, achieving 172 points. This remained the country's highest score until 2017. During Romania's show, Trăistariu was accompanied by dance group Big Bounce who performed a mixture of ballet and contemporary dance onstage. Following Eurovision, "Tornerò" achieved commercial success, reaching the top ten in Finland and Greece.

Before Eurovision

Selecția Națională 2006
Romanian Television (TVR) organized Selecția Națională 2006, a competition to select their entrant for the Eurovision Song Contest 2006. In early February 2006, the broadcaster published a provisory list of songs shortlisted to compete in the two semi-finals of Selecția Națională on 24 and 25 February:

Although selected to progress to the semi-finals of Selecția Națională, Edict's "Vine Badea" was eventually disqualified from the contest due to the song having received television and radio airplay in Moldova prior to TVR's cutoff date of 1 October 2005. Additionally, the initially submitted entries "Lacrima ta" by Paula Seling and Marcel Marza, "I Believe in Love" by Mike Peterson, "Reeditarea succesului" by Sistem, "Sentiment" by Blondy, and "Dragoste în univers" by Heaven were voluntarily withdrawn by the performers; TVR appointed replacement songs. The results of the semi-finals were:

Having also been hired for the semi-finals, Luminița Anghel and Cătălin Măruță hosted the final of Selecția Națională on 26 February 2006. The winning song was determined by a 50/50 combination of votes from a jury panel and a public televote. The jury consisted of music professionals Ionel Tudor, Mirela Fugaru, Cristian Faur, Mălina Olinescu, Mircea Dragan, Marius Moga and Titus Andrei. "Tornerò" by Mihai Trăistariu won Selecția Națională with a total of 22 points, consisting of ten awarded by the public (7,852 televotes) and 12 by the jury. The full results were:

Indiggo controversy

In a late-night talk show following the announcement of the winner, seventh-placed duo Indiggo accused TVR of vote rigging. Threatening with a €100,000 lawsuit, they based the accusation on reports that their voting line was continuously busy preventing people from voting for them when they called. TVR and the collaborating firm Voxline Communication dismissed the claims and stated that vote fraud was "impossible". Indiggo's "Be My Boyfriend" was removed from a CD of all Selecția Națională entries released by TVR.

Promotion
For promotional purposes, Trăistariu performed "Tornerò" on several occasions alongside other endeavours. Starting from 20 April 2006, he conducted a tour in 14 countries, including Malta, France, Greece, Cyprus, Monaco, Spain, Germany, Belgium, Croatia, Slovenia, Bulgaria and Moldova. This was preceded by a national tour sponsored by Cosmote, which commenced on 7 April and covered ten Romanian cities. "Tornerò" and its remixes were sent to radio stations and received airplay in several countries before the Eurovision Song Contest. Further promotion was done by Ralph Siegel's Jupiter Records in German-speaking Europe. A music video for "Tornerò" was released in 2006 and included on an enhanced CD release of the single that year. With costs for the clip amounting to a reported €50,000, it features Trăistariu walking in a hallway with dancers and other people, occasionally interacting with them and joining their activities.

At Eurovision
The Eurovision Song Contest 2006 took place at the O.A.C.A. Olympic Indoor Hall in Athens, Greece and consisted of one semi-final on 18 May, and the final on 20 May 2006. In Romania, the show was broadcast on TVR, with Dan Manoliu as the country's head of delegation. Trăistariu was scheduled for a technical rehearsal on 15 May 2006, which saw various changes concerning the staging being made. A reported €160,000 was allocated for his live performance. Over the course of the preparations, several dancers were fired and replaced.

According to the Eurovision rules at the time, selected countries, except the host nation and the "Big Four" (France, Germany, Spain and the United Kingdom), were required to qualify from the semi-final to compete for the final; the top ten countries from the semi-final progressed to the final. In 2006, Romania automatically qualified to the final due to their top 11 result the 2005 contest. On the occasion, Trăistariu performed in 12th place, preceded by Macedonia and followed by Bosnia and Herzegovina. Onstage, Trăistariu was accompanied by three male and two female dancers of dance group Big Bounce. Their choreography was done by CRBL and contained elements of ballet and contemporary dance.

Voting
Below is a breakdown of points awarded to Romania in the final, as well as by the country in the semi-final and final of the contest. On the latter occasion, Romania finished in fourth position, being awarded 172 points, including 12 by Moldova and Spain, and ten from Cyprus, Israel, Malta and Portugal. The only countries that didn't award the Romanian entry any points were Monaco and the Netherlands. This remained Romania's highest score until the introduction of a new voting system in 2016. The country awarded its 12 points to Bosnia and Herzegovina and Moldova in the semi-final and final of the contest, respectively. For the announcement of its points in the Grand Final, Andreea Marin Bănică was the Romanian spokesperson announcing the country's voting results.

Points awarded to Romania

Points awarded by Romania

Notes and references

Notes

References

2006
Countries in the Eurovision Song Contest 2006
Eurovision
Eurovision